Litomyšl is a town in Svitavy District in the Pardubice Region of the Czech Republic. It has about 9,900 inhabitants. It is former bishopric and Latin Catholic titular see. Litomyšl is known for the château-type castle complex of the Litomyšl Castle, which is a UNESCO World Heritage Site. The historic town centre with the castle complex is well preserved and is protected by law as an urban monument reservation.

Administrative parts
Litomyšl is made up of town parts of Lány, Litomyšl-město, Nedošín, Zahájí and Záhradí, and villages of Kornice, Nová Ves u Litomyšle, Pazucha, Pohodlí and Suchá. Nová Ves u Litomyšle and Pohodlí form an exclave of the municipal territory.

Geography
It lies in the Svitavy Uplands. The town is situated on the Loučná river. There are several fish ponds in the municipal territory, the largest is Velký Košíř in the western part.

History

The first written mention of Litomyšl is from 981. It is a record in Chronica Boemorum mentioning death of Duke Slavník. Litomyšl was originally a protective fortified settlement of the Slavník dynasty principality on a significant trade route from Bohemia to Moravia. In 1259, Litomyšl was promoted to a town by King Ottokar II of Bohemia.

During the following centuries the town was owned by various noble families: Kostka of Postupice, Pernštejn, Trauttmansdorff, Waldstein-Wartemberg and last Thurn und Taxis. The Litomyšl Castle was built in 1568–1581 by Pernštejns.

From 30 April 1344 till its suppression in 1474 the town was the seat of the Latin Catholic Diocese of Leitomischl until its territory was merged back into the (meanwhile Metropolitan Arch) Diocese of Prague. In 1970 it was nominally restored as titular see.

In the 19th century, Litomyšl ceased to be the main economical centre of the region, but remained the cultural and educational centre. Until 1918 Leitomischl – Litomyšl was a part of the Austrian monarchy (Austrian side after the compromise of 1867), head of the district with the same name, one of the 94 Bezirkshauptmannschaften or "okresní hejtmanství" in Bohemia.

Existence of the Jewish community is documented at least from the late 16th century. During the Holocaust in 1942, the last families were deported. Litomyšl had a German-speaking community until it was expelled in 1945 as a result of the Beneš decrees.

Demographics

Culture
Since 1946, the town hosts Smetanova Litomyšl, a large annual festival of classical music. It bears the name of the composer Bedřich Smetana, who is the most famous local native.

There is an extensive permanent exhibition of Olbram Zoubek's sculptures and art in Litomyšl Castle Vault Gallery.

Language
Until the late 19th century, the Litomyšl area had its own unique variety of the Czech language. This variety, named Teták by linguist Henning Andersen (after its word for "five", /tet/, as opposed to Standard Czech pět /pjet/), underwent an unusual sound change: bilabial consonants (/p/, /b/, /m/) became alveolars (/t/, /d/, /n/) before front vowels. Examples are /tekɲe/ ("nicely"; Standard Czech pěkně), /diːlej/ ("white"; Standard Czech bílý), or /nesto/ ("town"; Standard Czech město).

Sights

The main landmark of Litomyšl is the Litomyšl Castle, one of the largest Renaissance castles. The buildings of the castle precincts are exceptional for their architectural refinement. The castle complex also includes the birthplace of Bedřich Smetana, carriage house, stables, riding school, castle brewery, castle park and French-style garden. The castle complex was added to the UNESCO World Heritage List in 1999.

Neyt to the castle is the Piarist college with the seat of members of the order, the Church of the Finding the Holy Cross and adjacent monastery gardens. Today the gardens serve as a town park. The gardens include sculptures by Olbram Zoubek.

One of the most significant burgher houses is the house U Rytířů ("At the Knights"), a Renaissance house built from 1540 to 1546 with a notable stone façade.

Litomyšl is also home to the "Portmoneum", a museum of the artist and writer Josef Váchal in the home of his admirer Josef Portman, who commissioned Váchal's murals and painted furniture in the house.

Notable people

Jan Augusta (1500–1572), bishop of the Unitas Fratrum and Protestant reformer; lived here
Magdalena Dobromila Rettigová (1785–1845), author of the first cookbook written in Czech; lived here in 1834–1845
August von Jilek (1819–1898) physician and oceanographer
Bedřich Smetana (1824–1884), classical composer
Julius Mařák (1832–1899), painter and graphic designer
Eduard Pospichal (1838–1905), Austrian botanist
Josef Kořenský (1847–1938), traveller, educator and writer; worked here as a teacher in 1871–1874
Zdeněk Nejedlý (1878–1962), musicologist and politician
Arne Novák (1880–1939), critic and historian of literature
Karel Píč (1920–1995), Esperantist and writer
Miroslav Macek (born 1944), politician
Václav Jílek (born 1976), football manager
Markéta Adamová (born 1984), politician

Twin towns – sister cities

Litomyšl is twinned with:
 Levoča, Slovakia
 Noordenveld, Netherlands
 San Polo d'Enza, Italy

References

External links

 
Basic facts, sights, history

 
Populated places in Svitavy District
World Heritage Sites in the Czech Republic